The 1984 Maine Black Bears football team was an American football team that represented the University of Maine as a member of the Yankee Conference during the 1984 NCAA Division I-AA football season. In their fourth season under head coach Ron Rogerson, the Black Bears compiled a 5–6 record (2–3 against conference opponents) and finished fourth out of six teams in the Yankee Conference. Gary Hufnagle was the team captain.

Schedule

References

Maine
Maine Black Bears football seasons
Maine Black Bears football